Alan Warren FRPSL is an American philatelist who was appointed to the Roll of Distinguished Philatelists in 2019. He has received the Lichtenstein Medal. He is a specialist in the postage stamps and postal history of Scandinavia.

References

American philatelists
Living people
Signatories to the Roll of Distinguished Philatelists
Year of birth missing (living people)
Fellows of the Royal Philatelic Society London